Kürd or Kurd may refer to the following villages:
Kürd Eldarbəyli, Azerbaijan
Kürd Mahruzlu, Azerbaijan
Kürd, Goychay, Azerbaijan
Kürd, Jalilabad, Azerbaijan
Kürd, Qabala, Azerbaijan

See also
Kurd (disambiguation)
Kūrd, a tribe of Balochistan, Pakistan